The Karl Renner Prize, established on the occasion of the Austrian Federal President Karl Renner’s 80th birthday by the city of Vienna, is awarded to individuals or groups in recognition of merits for Vienna and Austria in cultural, social as well as economical concerns, acknowledged on a national or international level. Endowed with 43,600 euro, the prize is currently given to a maximum of six nominees every three years.

Prize winners

1951 
 Leopold Kunschak
 Johann Böhm
 Ludwig Brim (train dispatcher of the ÖBB, jumped on a driverless locomotive and successfully stopped it)
 Amalie (Mela) Hofmann (head of the nursery of the Zentralkrippenverein in der Lainzer Straße 172)
 Rudolf Keck (introduced a more economical method of gas creation to the Gaswerk Simmering)
 Hans Radl (teacher and disabled ex-service man, found a school for disabled children in the Kauergasse in 1926, was appointed to an international expert for instruction and education of disabled children by the UNESCO in 1951)
 Ewald Schild
 Entminungsdienst
 Wiener Philharmoniker
 Wiener Symphoniker

1952 
 Ewald Balser
 Hilde Wagener
 Edmund Josef Bendl (teacher and author, got citizens donating for the maintenance of the Observatorium Sonnblick with his lectures, his novel Der Sonnblick ruft and the movie adaptation)
 Martin Gusinde
 Paul Schiel (fisherman, rescued eight people from drowning despite his complete invalidity)
 Stefanie Tesar (welfare worker at the Fürsorgestelle im Landesgericht für Strafsachen und ehrenamtliche Mitarbeiterin in der Lebensmüden- und Trinkerfürsorge der Wiener Polizeidirektion)
 Hans Thirring
 Franz Wallack
 Österreichischer Buchklub der Jugend
 Österreichischer Bergrettungsdienst

1953 
 Bruno Buchwieser (son of Bruno Buchwieser, devoted to apprenticeship)
 Hans Kelsen
Adolf Melhuber (dedicated his life to the work with the blind)
Franz Schuster
Wendelin Wallisch (prevented gas explosion by throwing himself into the igniting flame)
 Helene Thimig-Reinhardt
 Karl Weigl
 Federal administration in Vienna of the Österreichischen Jugendrotkreuzes
 Theater der Jugend
 Verein Arbeitermittelschule

1954 
 Herbert Tichy, traveller and mountain climber
 Franz Salmhofer, composer and director of the opera
 Ilse Arlt (founder of the first welfare school, named Vereinigte Fachkurse für Volkspflege)
 Karl Mühl (expert in care for the deaf-mute, teacher at school for the deaf-mute, took care of hard of hearing soldiers in the Second World War, rebuilt the institute for the deaf-mute in Wien-Speising)
 Gustav Reinsperger (was taken into captivity as a prisoner of war by the Americans in 1945 and delivered to Russia, worked initially in emergency service and conducted military hospitals in severals prisoner-of-war camps between 1950 and 1953)
 Österreichische Akademie der Wissenschaften

1955 
 Julius Raab
 Adolf Schärf
 Leopold Figl
 Bruno Kreisky

1956 
 Hans Hirsch (head of the Kriegsblindenverband)
 Franz Lagler (prevented an explosion as a filling station attendant in Vienna)
 Fritz Moravec
 Walther oder Walter Peinsipp (Austrian diplomat in Hungary, organised relief convoy during the Hungarian Revolution of 1956.
 Workers of Kaprun (all involved in building the power station in Kaprun)

1957 
 Oskar Helmer
 Felix Hurdes
 Österreichischer Bundesjugendring
 Wiener Singakademie
 Singverein der Gesellschaft der Musikfreunde

1958 
 Andreas Rett
 Friedrich Weinhofer (locksmith and welder, prevented two explosions in the heat plant Malfattigasse in 1951 and 1958 respectively. Suffered from severe burns as a consequence.)
 Georg Piller und Gottfried Reisinger (Piller, a chauffeur, and Reisinger, a mechanic, helped capturing a robber suspected of murder, who severely injured them both by shooting.)
 Haus der Barmherzigkeit
 Wiener Berufsschulgemeinde
 Verband Wiener Volksbildung

1959 
 Igo Etrich
 Ferdinand Kadečka (Austrian jurist)
 Fritz Kreisler (awarded in the USA)
 Bruno Walter
Inventors of the Linz-Donawitz-Verfahren steelmaking (Ortwin Cuscoleca, Felix Grohs, Hubert Hauttmann, Fritz Klepp, Wolfgang Kühnelt, Rudolf Rinesch, Kurt Rösner, Herbert Trenkler)
 Krankenhaus der Barmherzigen Brüder
Pilotes of the Flugrettungsdienstes

1960 
The Karl Renner Prize was not awarded in 1960.

1961 
 Josef Hanns (prevented an explosion by driving a burning tank wagon away from a storage)
 Johann Heilmann (as a train operator, he prevented a train accident and was severely injured in the process)
 Stefan Jellinek
 Erwin Ringel
 Hans Rotter (secretary in association Trinkerheilstätte)
 Gesellschaft der Musikfreunde

1962 
The Karl Renner Prize was not awarded in 1962.

1963 
 Verein der Wiener Sängerknaben
 Verein Österreichische Krebsgesellschaft
 Notring der wissenschaftlichen Verbände Österreichs
 Österreichische Himalaya-Gesellschaft

1964 
The Karl Renner Prize was not awarded in 1964.

1965 
 Universität Wien
 Technische Hochschule Wien

1966 
 Musikalische Jugend Österreichs
 Chorvereinigung „Jung-Wien“
 Chor des Österreichischen Gewerkschaftsbundes under the guidance of Erwin Weiss
 Aktion Jugend am Werk

1967 
 University of Music and Performing Arts, Vienna
 Wiener Konzerthausgesellschaft
 Verband österreichischer Volksbüchereien
 Hugo Portisch ?
 Gerhard Weis ?

1969 
 Erich Lessing?

1974 
 Sigrid Löffler?

1975 
Felix Unger, Johann Navratil, Kurt Polzer
Wolfgang Enenkel

1978 
 Karl Popper

1984 
 Dieter Zehentmayr?

1986 
 Kardinal Franz König
 „Österreichische Arbeitsgemeinschaft Zöliakie“

1988 
 Gerhard Kletter

1989 
 „Autonome österreichische Frauenhäuser“

1991 
 Erwin Kräutler
 „Informationsstelle gegen Gewalt“

1996 
 Arthur Schneier

1998 
 Georg Sporschill
 Jüdisches Institut für Erwachsenenbildung
 Verein Künstler helfen Künstler

2001 
 Ute Bock
 Willi Resetarits
"one world foundation"
„Orpheus Trust“
Verein für Zivilcourage und Anti-Rassismus-Arbeit ZARA

? 
 Ronald Barazon
 Fritz Csoklich
 Egon Blaschka
 Václav Havel

2004 
 Ursula Seeber
 FIBEL (Fraueninitiative Bikulturelle Ehen und Lebensgemeinschaften),
 PEREGRINA (Bildungs-, Beratungs- und Therapiezentrum für Immigrantinnen)

2007 
 Reporters Without Borders
 „Verein Unabhängiger Iranischer Frauen in Österreich (GIF)“
 „Wiener Tafel“

2010 
 Hemayat
 Steine der Erinnerung
 Theodor Kramer Gesellschaft

2013 
 Andreas Maislinger
 Austrian Mauthausen Committee
 Irene Suchy

References

External links
 Announcement about the establishment of the Karl Renner Prize (in German)
 Information about the nomination and awarding of the Karl Renner Prize (in German)
 Austrian Journalist Club (available in English and German)

Austrian awards